Soldiers: A History of Men in Battle is a 1985 BBC television documentary series about the history of warfare from antiquity to the Falklands War.  Each episode looks at warfare from the perspective of different participants: infantryman, artillerist, cavalryman, tanker, airman, guerrilla, surgeon, logistician and commander.   The series and a companion book were written by John Keegan and Richard Holmes, and the series was presented by Frederick Forsyth.

Episodes
1 – "The Face of Battle"  (18 September 1985)
2 – "Cavalry"  (25 September 1985)
3 – "Gunner"  (2 October 1985)
4 – "Fighting Spirit"  (9 October 1985)
5 – "Infantry"  (23 October 1985)
6 – "Tank"  (30 October 1985)
7 – "Air Power"  (6 November 1985)
8 – "Sapper"  (13 November 1985)
9 – "Casualty"  (20 November 1985)
10 – "Sinews of War"  (27 November 1985)
11 – "Commander" (4 December 1985)
12 – "Irregular"  (11 December 1985)
13 – "Experience of War"  (18 December 1985)

External links
Soldiers: A History of Men in Battle (DVD)
Soldiers: A History of Men in Battle (book)

1985 British television series debuts
1985 British television series endings
1980s British documentary television series
British military television series
BBC television documentaries about history
British documentary television series
English-language television shows